U.S. Route 83 (US-83) is a part of the U.S. Highway System that runs from the Veterans International Bridge in Brownsville, Texas north to the Canadian border, north of Westhope, North Dakota, where it continues as Manitoba Highway 83. In the U.S. state of Oklahoma, US-83 is a main north–south highway that runs from the Texas border north to the Kansas border.

Route description
US 83 traverses the Oklahoma panhandle along the western border of Beaver County, but in this brief  stretch it encounters no fewer than three other U.S. Highways. Approximately  from the Texas line, US 83 intersects US 412 in the hamlet of Bryan's Corner. Continuing its journey northward, the highway crosses the Beaver River, then intersects US 64 in Turpin. At this intersection, US 270 west joins the highway, and together with US 83 proceeds northbound for the final  to the Kansas line.

Major intersections

References

External links

 Route 66 on TravelOK.com by the Oklahoma Tourism & Recreation Department
 Route 66 on Two Wheel Oklahoma
 National Route 66 Museum

 Oklahoma
83
Transportation in Beaver County, Oklahoma